Hans Ahlmann may refer to:
 Hans Wilhelmsson Ahlmann (1889–1974), Swedish geographer, glaciologist, and diplomat
 Hans Vilhelm Ahlmann (1852–1928), Swedish and Danish architect